Bhala Khar (also called: Palākhar, Bhalakar, Bhalākaris) is a village and union council in Punjab, Pakistan.

On 1 July 2004, Bhala Khar became the Union Council of Tehsil Kallar Syeda. Rawalpindi District was a Union Council of the Tehsil Kahuta.

"Palakhar" is a combination of two words 'polkh' and 'kaar'. 
The first word, 'polkh', refers to Polakh Khan Gakhar, the father of Sultan Hathi Gakhar. Hathi Gakhar was the chief of the Pothwar region, and fought against the Mughal emperor Zahir ud deen Muhammad]]. 
The second word, 'kaar', means "home", as it was the home of Polakh Gakhar, who is buried in Bhala Khar along with Zahir ud deen Babur.

References

External links 
Palākhar (populated place) Chinci (World Atlas)

Union councils of Kallar Syedan Tehsil
Populated places in Kallar Syedan Tehsil
Villages in Kallar Syedan Tehsil